Karina Lipiarska-Pałka (born 16 February 1987) is a Polish recurve archer.

She competed in the individual recurve event and the team recurve event at the 2015 World Archery Championships in Copenhagen, Denmark, and the 2016 Summer Olympics.

References

External links
 

Polish female archers
Living people
Sportspeople from Kraków
1987 births
Archers at the 2016 Summer Olympics
Olympic archers of Poland